Martín Casimiro Martínez Fagalde, usually known as Martín C. Martínez (22 February 1859, Montevideo - 21 January 1946) was a Uruguayan lawyer and politician.

He was Minister of Finance from 1903 to 1904 and in 1916. He took part in the Constituent Assembly that drafted the Uruguayan Constitution of 1918. Soon afterwards he was a member in the National Council of Administration (1919-1921).

He was successively member of three parties: Constitutional Party, National Party and Independent National Party.

References

1859 births
1946 deaths
Politicians from Montevideo
Uruguayan people of Spanish descent
Constitutional Party (Uruguay) politicians
National Party (Uruguay) politicians
Independent National Party (Uruguay) politicians
Members of the National Council of Administration
Ministers of Economics and Finance of Uruguay
Members of the Chamber of Representatives of Uruguay (1899–1902)
Members of the Chamber of Representatives of Uruguay (1905–1908)
Members of the Chamber of Representatives of Uruguay (1914–1917)
Members of the Senate of Uruguay (1917–1920)
Members of the Senate of Uruguay (1920–1923)
Members of the Senate of Uruguay (1923–1926)
Candidates for President of Uruguay
19th-century Uruguayan lawyers